Boophis microtympanum is a species of frog in the family Mantellidae.

It is endemic to Madagascar.
Its natural habitats are subtropical or tropical moist montane forests, moist savanna, subtropical or tropical high-altitude grassland, rivers, and heavily degraded former forest.
It is threatened by habitat loss.

References

microtympanum
Endemic frogs of Madagascar
Amphibians described in 1881
Taxonomy articles created by Polbot